Agate Beach is an unincorporated community in Lincoln County, Oregon, United States. Agate Beach is named for the agates that are found on the beaches of the Pacific Ocean between Newport and Yaquina Head. Agate Beach post office was established in 1912 and closed in 1971.

Historically, the area's most famous citizen was composer Ernest Bloch, who spent his later years in the community. The 1914 Ernest Bloch House is on the National Register of Historic Places and was once owned by the son of Asahel Bush and his family.

In June 2012 a 165-ton floating dock dislodged from the March 2011 Japanese tsunami washed up ashore, creating a popular tourist attraction as well as an imperative to remove potential invasive species.

See also
Agate Beach State Recreation Site

References

External links
Historic images of Agate Beach from Salem Public Library
Agate Beach cam from The Oregonian
Photo of WWI "Spruce Soldiers" of the Spruce Production Division at Agate Beach
Images of Ernest Bloch House from University of Oregon digital archives

Unincorporated communities in Lincoln County, Oregon
1912 establishments in Oregon
Unincorporated communities in Oregon